Grace for Drowning is the second solo studio album by Steven Wilson, producer, songwriter, and frontman of Porcupine Tree. It was released by Kscope on 26 September 2011 as a double album. The album received a nomination at the 54th Annual Grammy Awards for Best Surround Sound Album.

Background
After the release of his first solo album, Insurgentes, Steven Wilson spent time on a number of his other projects. These include Porcupine Tree's album The Incident in 2009, Blackfield's third album Welcome to My DNA, on 28 March 2011, and an ongoing project with Mikael Åkerfeldt (the leader of the band Opeth) named Storm Corrosion. However, amongst these projects, in 2010, he announced that he had started working on his second solo album as well.

In early June 2011, Wilson launched a minisite for the new album revealing the album's name and album art photographed by his longtime collaborator Lasse Hoile. Additionally, a free download of the track "Remainder the Black Dog" was also added. Sound and Vision magazine's website premiered the video of "Track One" on 10 August 2011. Not long after, Yahoo! Music debuted the music video for "Index". On 16 August, WNYC's website premiered a free download for the radio edit of "Like Dust I Have Cleared From My Eye". A video clip for "Remainder the Black Dog" was finally released on 31 August, through Guitar World magazine's website.

Upon completion of the album, Wilson said:

The special edition of the album is going to release on Blu-ray video disc with the music playing in 5.1 surround sound and accompanying visuals and videos for each track,.

The track Raider II is based on the murders of the "BTK killer", Dennis Rader.

Critical reception 

Reception for the album was generally favourable. Ben Bland of Stereoboard wrote positively of the album, stating "For a work so defiantly widescreen in its intentions as this, it is truly remarkable that there is nothing that could, or rather should, be accused of being filler or being over the top." William Ruhlmann from AllMusic gave a mixed review to the album and compared it to Wilson's other projects, Porcupine Tree and Bass Communion and commented: "Grace for Drowning has a particular conception in terms of its emotional journey from sadness through anger to acceptance, but it is also just another in a lengthy discography of albums by Wilson under various names in relatively similar styles". Brice Ezell of PopMatters gave a very positive review to the album, scoring it 8 out of 10. He wrote that "[Wilson] may remain a divisive musical personality, but Grace for Drowning is such a fine listen that even the most adamantly opposed listener has to at least give him style points, both for the artistic presentation of the album and the music within".

Track listing

Personnel
Credits adapted from the official website

Managerial
Andy Leff – Acme Music
Alex Leeks – assistant

Technical and production
Steven Wilson – production, mixing
Pat Mastelotto – additional production, electronic drums on "No Part of Me" and "Index"
Dave Stewart – string & choir arrangements
Mat Collis – engineering
Paschal Byrne – mastering

Visuals and imagery
Lasse Hoile – photography, film director
Bettina Ejlersen – photography assistant
Carl Glover – art director
Ray Shulman – Blu-ray authoring

Sounding
Steven Wilson – vocals on all tracks except "Sectarian", "Raider Prelude" and "Belle de Jour"
Dave Kerzner – sound design on "Raider II"
Synergy Vocals – choir on "Postcard", "Raider Prelude" and "Raider II"

Musicians

Steven Wilson – keys (CD1 tracks 1–5 and 7 / CD2 1–5), guitars (CD1 tracks 2, 3, and 5 / CD2 tracks 1–5), autoharp (CD1 track 2 / CD2 tracks 1, 2, 5), bass guitar (CD1 tracks 2 and 5 / CD2 tracks 1 and 4), percussion (CD1 track 4 / CD2 track 4), piano (CD1 tracks 5–7 / CD2 tracks 4 and 5), gong (CD1 track 6), glockenspiel (CD1 track 7), programming (CD2 track 2), harmonium (CD2 tracks 4 and 5)
Jordan Rudess – piano (CD1 tracks 1 and 3 / CD2 track 4)
Theo Travis – saxophone (CD1 tracks 2, 4 and 7 / CD2 track 4), clarinet (CD1 track 3 and 7 / CD2 track 4), flute (CD1 track 7 / CD2 track 4) 
Ben Castle – clarinet (CD1 track 2)
Nick Beggs – Chapman stick (CD1 tracks 2 and 7 / CD2 track 4), bass guitar (tracks CD1 tracks 4 and 7 / CD2 track 4)
Tony Levin – bass guitar (CD1 track 3 / CD2 track 5)

Nic France – drums (CD1 track 2–3, 5 and 7 / CD2 track 3–5)
Pat Mastelotto – acoustic and electronic drums (CD1 track 4 / CD2 track 2)
Markus Reuter – U8 touch guitar (CD1 track 4)
Trey Gunn – warr guitar and bass guitar (CD1 track 4)
London Session Orchestra – strings (CD1 tracks 4 and 5 / CD2 tracks 1 and 2)
Steve Hackett – guitar (CD1 track 7)
Mike Outram – guitar (CD2 track 4)
Sand Snowman – guitar (CD2 track 4)

Deluxe Edition also contains:
120 page hardback book.
Blu-ray with 5.1 surround sound mix, high resolution stereo and additional demos.
Blu-ray also contains films for five tracks (directed by Lasse Hoile), photo galleries, handwritten notes and lyrics.

DVD 
Wilson and longtime collaborator Lasse Hoile announced in late August 2012 that a DVD, filmed live in Mexico City on the Grace for Drowning tour, would be released on 24 September 2012.

Tour
Touring band members included drummer Marco Minnemann, bassist and backing vocalist Nick Beggs, guitarist Aziz Ibrahim (First European leg only), John Wesley (First US leg only), or Niko Tsonev (Second leg), keyboardist Adam Holzman, and Theo Travis on flute, saxes and clarinet. Drummer/keyboardist Gary Husband was originally announced on keys, but pulled out for medical reasons. Ibrahim was unable to tour in the US due to visa problems.

First leg

Second leg

Charts

Awards

Grammy Awards

|-
| style="text-align:center;"| 2012 ||style="text-align:left;"|Grace For Drowning || Best Surround Sound Album || 
|-
|}

Progressive Music Awards

|-
| style="text-align:center;" rowspan="2"| 2012 ||style="text-align:left;"|"Raider II" || Anthem || 
|-
|Grace for Drowning (Deluxe Edition) || Grand Design || 
|}

References

2011 albums
Steven Wilson albums
Kscope albums